Jean-Baptiste Chavannes ( – 23 February 1791) was a Dominican Creole abolitionist, and rebel soldier.

Biography
He was the son of rich mulatto parents, and received a good education. In 1778 the expedition under d'Estaing, who sent the Chasseurs-Volontaires de Saint-Domingue to assist the U.S. Continental Army, Chavannes was one of those who had volunteered. He distinguished himself during the operations in Virginia and New York, and specially during the retreat from Savannah in December 1778. Once the independence of the American colonies had been accomplished, Chavannes returned to Saint-Domingue.

When Vincent Ogé landed near Cap-Français, 23 October 1790, intending to create an agitation amongst the people of African descent in favor of their political rights, Chavannes sided with him. Chavannes wanted all the slaves to be declared free, but Ogé did not follow his advice, and informed the assembly of his intention to take the opposite course. The mulattoes raised a force of about 1,000 men.

The mulattoes being defeated by the colonists, Ogé, Chavannes, and a few others took refuge in the Spanish part of the island, and the Saint Dominican assembly asked for their extradition, according to treaty. The jurist Vicente Faura made a powerful plea in their favor, and the king of Spain gave him a decoration, but the Royal Audiencia of Santo Domingo decided against the refugees, who were delivered to the Saint Dominican authorities on 21 December 1790.

Two months later Chavannes and Ogé were sentenced to be hammered to death, and the sentence was executed in the presence of the provincial assembly and authorities of Cap-Français.

Notes

References

External links
 

1748 births
1791 deaths
18th-century executions by France
Abolitionists
Executed Haitian people
Executed revolutionaries
Haitian independence activists
Haitian people of French descent
Haitian people of Mulatto descent
Haitian soldiers
People from Nord (Haitian department)
People executed by breaking wheel
People executed by the Ancien Régime in France
People of Saint-Domingue
People of the American Revolution
People of the Haitian Revolution